Car Lot Rescue is an American reality documentary television series that aired for eight episodes on Spike. The series premiered on February 10, 2013.

The series' title was changed many times through production. It was first named Car Boss, which was later changed to Car Lot Cowboy and was officially announced with its final name on December 11, 2012.

Premise
The series followed auto dealership "doctor" Tom Stuker as he traveled across the United States and assisted failing establishments to reach new potentials.

Episodes

References

External links
 
 

2013 American television series debuts
2013 American television series endings
English-language television shows
Spike (TV network) original programming
Auto dealerships of the United States